Clanculus cognatus is a species of sea snail, a marine gastropod mollusk in the family Trochidae, the top snails.

Description
The size of the shell varies between 3 mm and 9 mm.

Distribution
This marine shell occurs off the Ryukyus, Japan, Taiwan and the Philippines

References

External links
 To Encyclopedia of Life
 To World Register of Marine Species

cognatus
Gastropods described in 1903